Dichomeris xuthostola is a moth in the family Gelechiidae. It was described by Walsingham in 1911. It is found in Mexico (Tabasco).

The forewings are reddish ochreous, with a broad diffused ferruginous shade along the dorsum from the base, embracing the outer half of the fold, a slight shade of the same colour on the outer half of the costa reaching to the apex. There is a single brownish fuscous dot at the end of the cell and a narrow broken shade of the same colour around the apex and termen at the base of the ochreous cilia. The hindwings are brownish grey.

References

Moths described in 1911
xuthostola